Michael Cheng Lai Hin (born ) is a former Hong Kong professional footballer who played as a striker.

Cheng was arrested by the ICAC on match fixing charges in 2017 but was subsequently cleared.

Club career

Kitchee
Cheng Lai Hin signed for Kitchee when he was only 18.

Cheng Lai Hin was one of the torch bearers for Hong Kong for the 2008 Olympic torch relay in the SAR.

On 29 November 2008, in the 2008-09 Hong Kong Senior Challenge Shield semi-final, Cheng Lai Hin came on as a substitute and scored Kitchee's second goal, but Kitchee still lost to Sun Hei SC.

On 31 May 2010, in the 2010 Singapore Cup, Cheng Lai Hin scored at the 111-minute, from a Lo Kwan Yee corner against Beijing Guoan Talent. His goal helped Kitchee win the match 2:1 and proceed to the quarter finals.

South China
On 8 June 2010, Cheng Lai Hin signed for South China in 2010, following the footsteps of Chan Siu Ki. He left Kitchee because coach Josep Gombau did not think he fitted Kitchee's 4–3–3 formation. He joined South China expecting to be only a reserve to replace the departing Chao Pengfei. South China's Steven Lo compared Cheng favourably to Jong Tae Se of North Korea but Cheng himself played down the expectations.

In the 2010-11 Hong Kong Senior Challenge Shield semi-final against Tai Po FC, Cheng Lai Hin scored twice to help South China win 3:0 and advance to the final.

In the 2011 Asian Challenge Cup, Cheng Lai Hin came on as a substitute against Ulsan Hyundai in the third place play-off and scored South China's second goal. But South China lost the match 2:4 to finish last.

In the 2011 AFC Cup away game to East Bengal FC, Cheng Lai Hin scored the second goal for South China, his first goal in the competition, at the 87-minute. The match ended 3:3.

In the crucial away leg to Persipura Jayapura, a 2011 AFC Cup game, Chan Siu Ki was suspended and Cheng Lai Hin was required to partner Mateja Kezman up front. Kezman claimed he was confident of the partnership with Cheng. But in the end South China lost the match 2:4 and any chance to qualify for the second phase.

In his first season at South China, Cheng Lai Hin finished as the top scorer of the club by scoring a total of 7 goals  in all local competitions, despite being not a regular starting member, 1 more than Mateja Kezman and 2 more than regular starter Chan Siu Ki.

Pegasus
Cheng joined Pegasus in the summer of 2015.

International career
On 20 June 2010, Cheng Lai Hin scored a hat-trick for Hong Kong national football team in the 2010 Hong Kong–Macau Interport. His goals helped Hong Kong win the match 5–1 and claimed the Interport Trophy. On 30 September 2011, Cheng Lai-Hin scored the second goal in the 3:3 draw with the Philippines in the 2011 Long Teng Cup.

Match Fixing Scandal
On 6 October 2016, Cheng was one of six current and former Pegasus players to be taken in for questioning by the ICAC on allegations of match fixing. He was formally charged on 28 June 2017 for conspiracy to defraud and offering an advantage to an agent.

On 19 April 2018, Cheng was found not guilty of both charges after the judge ruled that he could not convict him beyond a reasonable doubt.

Honours

Club
Happy Valley
Hong Kong First Division: 2018–19

International
Hong Kong
2009 East Asian Games Football Event: Gold

Career statistics

Club
As of 6 December 2006

International
As of 5 October 2011

References

External links
Cheng Lai Hin at HKFA

1986 births
Living people
Hong Kong footballers
Association football forwards
Hong Kong Rangers FC players
Kitchee SC players
Hong Kong First Division League players
Hong Kong Premier League players
Hong Kong FC players
South China AA players
TSW Pegasus FC players
Happy Valley AA players
Hong Kong international footballers
Footballers at the 2006 Asian Games
Asian Games competitors for Hong Kong